A coronet is a small crown consisting of ornaments fixed on a metal ring. A coronet differs from other kinds of crowns in that most coronets do not have arches, and from a tiara in that a coronet completely encircles the head, while a tiara does not.

In other languages, this distinction is not made as usually the same word for crown is used irrespective of rank (etc.)

Today, its main use is not as a headgear (indeed, many people entitled to a coronet never have a physical one created), but as a rank symbol in heraldry, adorning somone's coat of arms.

Etymology
The word stems from the Old French coronete, a diminutive of co(u)ronne ('crown'), itself from the Latin corona (also 'wreath') and from the Ancient Greek κορώνη (korōnē; 'garland' or 'wreath').

Traditionally, such headgear is used by nobles and by princes and princesses in their coats of arms, rather than by monarchs, for whom the word 'crown' is customarily reserved in English, while many languages have no such terminological distinction. As a coronet shows the rank of the respective noble, in the German and Scandinavian languages there is also the term rangkrone (literally 'rank crown').

Commonwealth usage

In the United Kingdom, a peer wears the coronet on one occasion only: for a royal coronation, when it is worn along with coronation robes, equally standardised as a luxurious uniform.

In the peerages of the United Kingdom, the design of a coronet shows the rank of its owner, as in German, French and various other heraldic traditions.  Dukes were the first individuals authorised to wear coronets. Marquesses acquired coronets in the 15th century, earls in the 16th and viscounts and barons in the 17th. Until the barons received coronets in 1661, the coronets of earls, marquesses and dukes were engraved while those of viscounts were plain. After 1661, however, viscomital coronets became engraved, while baronial coronets were plain. Coronets may not bear any precious or semi-precious stones.

Since a person entitled to wear a coronet customarily displays it in their coat of arms above the shield and below the helmet and crest, this can provide a useful clue as to the owner of a given coat of arms. In Canadian heraldry, descendants of the United Empire Loyalists are entitled to use a Loyalist military coronet (for descendants of members of Loyalist regiments) or Loyalist civil coronet (for others) in their arms.

Royal usage

Members of the British royal family often have coronets on their coats of arms, and may wear actual coronets at coronations (e.g., Princesses Elizabeth and Margaret at the 1937 coronation of their father as George VI). They were made, according to regulations made by King Charles II in 1661, shortly after his return from exile in France (getting a taste for its lavish court style; Louis XIV started monumental work at Versailles that year) during the Restoration. They vary depending on the prince's relationship to the monarch. Occasionally, additional royal warrants vary the designs for individuals. The most recent (and most comprehensive) royal warrant concerning coronets was the 19 November 1917 warrant of George V.

The coronet of the heir apparent is distinctive in itself as it has a single arch with a globe and cross.

Municipal usage
Certain types of local government have special coronet types assigned to them.

Danish coronet rankings

Spanish coronet rankings
All over the world, Spanish heraldry has used these crowns and coronets:

Swedish coronet rankings

Former monarchies

Kingdom of France 
The hierarchy among the French nobility, which was identical for non-royal titles to the British hierarchy of peers, should not be understood to be as rigid in the ranking of titleholders as the latter. In particular, a title was not a good indication of actual preeminence or precedence: ancestry, marriages, high office, military rank and the family's historical renown counted far more than the precise title. Some distinguished families held a title no higher than count or even baron, but were proud of their ancient origin. Moreover, most of the nobility was legally untitled. Some hereditary titles could be acquired by a nobleman who purchased a "titled" fief, while titres de courtoisie ('courtesy titles') were freely assumed in the absence of strict regulation by the French crown and became more numerous than titles legally borne. In the 17th and 18th centuries, people assumed and used freely coronets of ranks that they did not have; and, in the 19th and 20th centuries abuse was still made of 'courtesy titles'. Titles continued to be granted until the Second Empire fell in 1870, and legally survive among their descendants.

The only title that was never usurped under the ancien régime, and rarely without some excuse afterwards, was the title of duc – because it was so often attached to the rank of peer of France, which carried specific legal prerogatives, such as the right to a seat in the Parliament of Paris. As a result, the title of duc was actually, as well as nominally, at the top of the scale after the royal family and foreign princes, and a cut above all of the other nobility. During the ancien régime, 'prince' was a rank, not a title, hence there was no coronet.

Roi (sovereign): closed crown of fleurs-de-lis (the crown was open until the early 16th century)
Dauphin (heir apparent): initially an open crown of fleurs-de-lis; starting with Henri IV's son (1601–10), the crown is closed with dolphins instead of arches
Fils de France and Petit-fils de France (sons and grandsons of a sovereign): open coronet of fleurs-de-lis
Prince du sang (male-line descendants of a sovereign): originally an open coronet alternating fleurs-de-lis and acanthus leaves (called strawberry leaves in English blazon), but the open coronet of fleurs-de-lis was used in the 17th and 18th centuries
Pair de France (peer of the realm): coronet of the title (usually duke) with a blue velvet bonnet, along with a mantle armoyé (reproducing the arms) fringed with gold and lined with ermine
Duc (duke): coronet of acanthus leaves
Marquis (marquess): coronet of alternating acanthus leaves and groups of three pearls in trefoil (or two pearls side by side in some versions)
Comte (count): coronet of pearls
Vicomte (viscount): coronet of four large pearls (three visible) alternating with smaller pearls
Vidame (peculiar French title, for protectors of the temporal estates of a bishopric): coronet of four crosses (three visible)
Baron: helm of gold wreathed with a string of small pearls
Chevalier (knight): helm of gold
Ecuyer (squire): helm

Holy Roman Empire 
The Holy Roman Empire, and consequently its successor states (Austria, Germany and others), had a system very similar to that of the British, although the design varied.

Herzogskrone: the coronet of a Herzog (duke) displays five visible leaves, with a crimson bonnet on top, surmounted by five visible arches and a globus cruciger.
Fürstenkrone: the coronet of a Fürst (prince) shows five visible leaves, with a crimson bonnet on top, surmounted by three visible arches and a globus cruciger.
Landgrafenkrone: the coronet of a Landgraf (landgrave) shows five visible leaves, surmounted by three visible arches and a globus cruciger.
Grafenkrone: the coronet of a Graf (count) displays nine visible tines with pearls. Some of the senior comital houses used coronets showing five leaves and four pearls (some mediatized counties and minor principalities had other types of coronets that distinguished them from regular counts).
Freiherrnkrone: the coronet of a Freiherr (baron) shows seven visible tines with pearls.
Adelskrone: the coronet of Adel members (untitled nobility) displays five visible tines with pearls. Sometimes, the central and outer tines are leaves and the other tines are headed by pearls. In the southern states of Bavaria and Württemberg, usually all tines are headed by pearls.

Considering the religious nature of the Holy Roman Empire, one can say that, except for the short-lived Napoleonic states, no continental secular system of heraldry historically was so neatly regulated as under the British crown. Still, there are often traditions (often connected to the Holy Roman Empire, e.g., those in Sweden, Denmark or Russia) that include the use of crown and coronets. While most languages do not have a specific term for coronets, but simply use the word meaning crown, it is possible to determine which of those crowns are for peerage or lower-level use, and thus can by analogy be called coronets.

Precisely because there are many traditions and more variation within some of these, there is a plethora of continental coronet types. Indeed, there are also some coronets for positions that do not exist or entitle one to a coronet in the Commonwealth tradition. Such a case in French (ancien, i.e., royal era) heraldry, where coronets of rank did not come into use before the 16th century, is the vidame, whose coronet (illustrated) is a metal circle mounted with three visible crosses (there is no documentary or archeological evidence that such a coronet was ever made).

Often, coronets are substituted by helmets, or only worn on a helmet.

Kingdom of Portugal 
These coronets and crowns were used in Portuguese heraldry:

See also
Polos
Corolla (headgear)
Tiara
Crown (heraldry)
Phra kiao

References

Sources and external links
The Coronets of Members of the Royal Family and of the Peerage
Heraldica.org French heraldry
Illustration of the coat of arms of the Duke of Norfolk, showing the design of coronet
Illustration of the coat of arms of the Earl of Annandale and Hartfell, showing the design of coronet
The Crowns, Coronets and Crests of the Ladies and Knights of the Garter

Crowns (headgear)
Formal insignia
Monarchy
Regalia
State ritual and ceremonies
Types of jewellery
Crowns in heraldry